Lieutenant-General Sir Herbert Edward Watts  (14 February 1858 – 15 October 1934) was a British Army officer who commanded 7th Division and later XIX Corps during the First World War.

Early military career
Watts was born on 14 February 1858, the son of the Reverend R.L.R. Watts, the vicar of Wisbech. He was educated at The King's School, Peterborough and at Tours, and was commissioned as a second lieutenant into the 14th Regiment of Foot in April 1880 (the regiment changed name to become The Prince of Wales's Own West Yorkshire Regiment later the same year). He served with the regiment for 30 years, during which he was promoted to lieutenant on 1 July 1881, captain on 6 March 1889, and major on 20 March 1899. Following the outbreak of the Second Boer War in late 1899, he served with the 2nd battalion of his regiment in South Africa 1899-1902. He took part in operations in the Natal, including the battles of Vaal Krantz (6-7 February 1900) and the Tugela Heights and Pieter's Hill (14-27 February 1900) leading to the Relief of Ladysmith. In the following months he served in the Natal, and from July to November 1900 in the Transvaal. During the war he was mentioned in despatches five times and received the brevet promotion to lieutenant-colonel on 29 November 1900. He was appointed 2nd in command of his battalion on 7 March 1902, and after peace was declared the following month, left South Africa on board the SS Bavarian to arrive in the United Kingdom in June 1902.

He was promoted to Colonel in 1908, and finished his army career as the commander of No. 9 District in Eastern Command, holding this post from 1910 until he retired in 1914.

First World War

Shortly after Watts' retirement, the outbreak of the First World War meant that he returned almost immediately to the Army. He was given command of 21st Brigade in 7th Division; the division was composed of regular battalions recalled from overseas service on the outbreak of war and formed into a new division in England. Watts remained with the brigade until the Battle of Loos in September 1915, when Major-General Thompson Capper, commanding the division, was killed in action and Watts took over command. With the brief exception of a few days in July 1916 as General Officer Commanding 38th (Welsh) Division - under Watts, the division took its objective, Mametz Wood, though with severe losses - Watts would remain with the division for the next year and a half. He later became General Officer Commanding the XIX Corps.

Watts was regarded by Field-Marshal Douglas Haig as "a plucky hard little man" and "a fine leader" but also "a distinctly stupid man [who] lacks imagination". While his courage and fighting spirit were well-regarded, planning and organisation were left to his divisional staff. His personality impressed regimental officers; he required Territorial officers of the 61st Division to repeat after him in chorus a salutary maxim: “The natural corollary of delegation of authority is intelligent supervision”. Watts had never attended the Staff College, spending his earlier career entirely on regimental service. Watts unveiled the War Memorial at Mitcham in Surrey in 1920.

Family

In 1896 he married Elizabeth Daly.

References

Sources
 
 
 

|-

1858 births
1934 deaths
British Army lieutenant generals
British Army generals of World War I
Knights Commander of the Order of the Bath
Knights Commander of the Order of St Michael and St George
West Yorkshire Regiment officers
British Army personnel of the Second Boer War